Apostolic poverty is a Christian doctrine professed in the thirteenth century by the newly formed religious orders, known as the mendicant orders, in direct response to calls for reform in the Roman Catholic Church. In this, these orders attempted to live their lives without ownership of lands or accumulation of money, following the precepts given to the seventy disciples in the Gospel of Luke (10:1-24), and succeeding to varying degrees. The ascetic Pope Paschal II's solution of the Investiture Controversy in his radical Concordat of 1111 with the Emperor, repudiated by the cardinals, was that the ecclesiastics of Germany should surrender to the imperial crown their fiefs and secular offices. Paschal proved to be the last of the Gregorianist popes.

The provocative doctrine was a challenge to the wealth of the church and the concerns about ensuing corruption it brought: rejected by the hierarchy of the Church, it found sympathetic audiences among the disaffected poor of the 12th, 13th, and 14th centuries.

The doctrine of apostolic poverty was condemned as heresy in 1323, but it continued to be a source of debate.

History

Humiliati

One group which was a major proponent of apostolic poverty was the Humiliati, the "Humble Ones".  Founded by a wool merchant, they established communities scattered around Italy and France, organized on the principle of a simple way of life for the laity, who shared their goods while remaining in family units. They remained primarily a lay movement, and came to reject the authority of the hierarchy and the clergy. For this and other reasons, they were later to be declared heretical by the Catholic Church.

It is often assumed that Saint Francis of Assisi was inspired to form the Franciscans by their movement, in an effort to emulate the poverty of Jesus Christ and to bring his message through a simple life and example, while strictly adhering to the beliefs of the Catholic Church. Saint Dominic founded a similar order, the Order of Preachers, better known as the Dominicans.

Waldenses

Sometime during the 1170's, a wealthy cloth merchant known as Waldes or Peter Waldo experienced a religious conversion, which has been attributed to him hearing a minstrel retell the story of St. Alexis. After hearing this recital, Waldes visited a master theologian in order to determine the surest way to salvation, to which the theologian replied he should follow the scripture; specifically Matthew 19:21: 'If you wish to go the whole way, then go and sell everything you have, and give to the poor'. Waldes then, after providing for his family, gave away all his possessions and followed a life of apostolic poverty. He had the Gospel translated and began openly preaching, gaining many followers who too embraced lives of apostolic poverty; these men and women became known as the Waldensians. Walter Map, though critical of the Waldensians lack of education and therefore their inability to preach, conceded that they did truly live in a state of poverty comparable to the apostles, describing them as having 'no permanent homes...possessing nothing and having everything in common like the Apostles, naked, following a naked Christ'.

Franciscans

The Franciscans were authorized by Pope Gregory IX to have non-members who would look after their material needs, while the friars themselves would own nothing and would only make use according to the vow of poverty of what was given to them. From the beginning, two tendencies developed. Some friars, referred to as the Zelanti, living more isolated and simpler lives, strictly observed the poverty enjoined by the testament of Saint Francis. Others lived in convents in the towns, tending the attached churches with the necessary liturgical furnishings and devoting themselves also to study and preaching, which required the use of books. They observed the Franciscan Rule in accordance with interpretations officially made by the Popes. Already Gregory IX had indicated that the testament of St Francis did not oblige the friars in conscience. Pope Innocent IV gave the Franciscans permission to appoint "procurators" to buy, sell and administer goods given to them. Bonaventure, who become minister general in 1257, tried to reconcile the two tendencies and is sometimes called the second founder of the Order, to which he gave its first General Constitutions. Conflicts with the secular clergy and with lay teachers in the universities led to accusations of hypocrisy with regard to the profession of poverty from outsiders, as well as from those members of the order formerly known as the Zelanti, but who then began to be referred to as the Spirituals, because of their association with the Age of the Spirit that the apocalyptic writer Joachim of Fiore had foretold would begin in 1260.

In the early years of the 14th century, the conflict between the Spirituals and the Conventual Franciscans came to a head. The Spirituals, who in the 13th century were led by the Joachimist Peter Olivi, adopted more extreme positions that discredited the notion of apostolic poverty in some eyes and led to condemnation by Pope John XXII.

In his 14 August 1279 bull Exiit qui seminat, Pope Nicholas III had confirmed the arrangement already established by Pope Gregory IX, by which all property given to the Franciscans was vested in the Holy See, which granted the friars the mere use of it. The bull declared that renunciation of ownership of all things "both individually but also in common, for God's sake, is meritorious and holy; Christ, also, showing the way of perfection, taught it by word and confirmed it by example, and the first founders of the Church militant, as they had drawn it from the fountainhead itself, distributed it through the channels of their teaching and life to those wishing to live perfectly". Pope Clement V's  bull Exivi de Paradiso of 20 November 1312 failed to effect a compromise between the two factions. Clement V's successor, Pope John XXII was determined to suppress what he considered to be the excesses of the Spirituals, who contended eagerly for the view that Christ and his apostles had possessed absolutely nothing, either separately or jointly, and who were citing Exiit qui seminat in support of their view. In 1317, he formally condemned the group of them known as the Fraticelli.

On 26 March 1322, John removed the ban on discussion of Nicholas III's bull and commissioned experts to examine the idea of poverty based on belief that Christ and the apostles owned nothing. The experts disagreed among themselves, but the majority condemned the idea on the grounds that it would condemn the Church's right to have possessions. The Franciscan chapter held in Perugia in May 1322 declared on the contrary: "To say or assert that Christ, in showing the way of perfection, and the Apostles, in following that way and setting an example to others who wished to lead the perfect life, possessed nothing either severally or in common, either by right of ownership and dominium or by personal right, we corporately and unanimously declare to be not heretical, but true and catholic." By the bull Ad conditorem canonum of 8 December of the same year, John XXII, declaring that "it was ridiculous to pretend that every egg and piece of bread given to and eaten by the Friars Minor belonged to the pope", forced them to accept ownership by ending the arrangement according to which all property given to the Franciscans was vested in the Holy See, which granted the friars the mere use of it. He thus demolished the fictitious structure that gave the appearance of absolute poverty to the life of the Franciscan friars, a structure that "absolved the Franciscans from the moral burden of legal ownership, and enabled them to practise apostolic poverty without the inconvenience of actual poverty". And on 12 November 1323 he issued the short bull Cum inter nonnullos, which declared "erroneous and heretical" the doctrine that Christ and his apostles had no possessions whatever.

Influential members of the order protested, including the minister general Michael of Cesena, the English provincial William of Ockham, and Bonagratia of Bergamo. In 1324, Louis the Bavarian sided with the Spirituals and accused the Pope of heresy. In reply to the argument of his opponents that Nicholas III's bull Exiit qui seminat was fixed and irrevocable, John XXII issued the bull Quia quorundam of 10 November 1324, in which he declared that it cannot be inferred from the words of the 1279 bull that Christ and the apostles had nothing, adding: "Indeed, it can be inferred rather that the Gospel life lived by Christ and the Apostles did not exclude some possessions in common, since living 'without property' does not require that those living thus should have nothing in common."

In 1328 Michael of Cesena was summoned to Avignon to explain the Order's intransigence in refusing the Pope's orders and its complicity with Louis of Bavaria. Michael was imprisoned in Avignon, together with Francesco d'Ascoli, Bonagratia and William of Ockham. In January of that year Louis of Bavaria entered Rome and had himself crowned emperor. Three months later, he declared John XXII deposed and installed the Spiritual Franciscan Pietro Rainalducci as Pope. The Franciscan chapter that opened in Bologna on 28 May reelected Michael of Cesena, who two days before had escaped with his companions from Avignon. But in August Louis the Bavarian and his pope had to flee Rome before an attack by Robert, King of Naples. Only a small part of the Franciscan Order joined the opponents of John XXII, and at a general chapter held in Paris in 1329 the majority of all the houses declared their submission to the Pope. With the bull "Quia vir reprobus" of 16 November 1329, John XXII replied to Michael of Cesena's attacks on Ad conditorem canonum, Cum inter and Quia quorundam. In 1330 Antipope Nicholas V submitted, followed later by the ex-general Michael, and finally, just before his death, by Ockham.

See also
 Christian views on poverty and wealth

Notes

External links
 Poverty in the Catholic Encyclopedia

Mendicant orders
Christian ethics
Poverty
Poverty
Wealth